Mother Mother (formed in 2005) are a Canadian band.

Mother Mother may also refer to:

 "Mother Mother" (song), 1996 song by Tracy Bonham
 Mother Mother (film), 2014 Taiwanese television film